Leroy "Colonel" Beecher (May 10, 1884 – October 11, 1952) was a pitcher in Major League Baseball. He played for the New York Giants.

References

External links

1884 births
1952 deaths
Major League Baseball pitchers
New York Giants (NL) players
Baseball players from Ohio
Houghton Giants players
Springfield Senators players
Newark Indians players
Rochester Bronchos players
Topeka Jayhawks players
People from Swanton, Ohio